Cheeses... (of Nazareth) is an album by Five Iron Frenzy released in 2003. It contains a number of rarities and live tracks as a thank you to fans; the band would break up at the end of 2003. When it was announced that this album would be made, the band asked fans to call a provided phone number and leave suggestions for what the album should contain.

The original album name was "Cheeses of Nazareth", but the band decided it might be considered sacrilegious, so it was shortened to "Cheeses...". The title is based on a joke circulating on the Internet with a punchline of Cheeses of Nazareth. The album's interior contains a map of the U.S. showing a reference to the cheeses of Nazareth, Pennsylvania.

The album mainly appealed to the group's dedicated fan base. However, it managed to chart on both the Billboard heatseekers and contemporary Christian chart in the US.

Track listing

Personnel 
Five Iron Frenzy
Leanor "Jeff the Girl" Ortega – saxophone
Dennis Culp – trombone
Keith Hoerig – bass guitar
Sonnie Johnston – guitar
Scott Kerr – guitar
Micah Ortega – guitar
Reese Roper – "vocals", liner notes
Andrew "Chaka" Verdecchio – drums
Nathanael "Brad" Dunham - trumpet

Additional personnel
Melinda Culp – photography
Aaron James – package design
Masaki Liu – engineer, mastering, mixing
Frank Tate – executive producer

The Second Coming of Cheeses...

At an unspecified date in 2014 another collection of rarities titled The Second Coming of Cheeses... was quietly released as a digital exclusive sold to fans who had donated to Five Iron Frenzy's 2012 Kickstarter campaign, though any person with the web link can purchase the album. No liner notes exist identifying the origins of each song as was included with the original Cheeses... collection, but like that collection it is mostly joke or gimmicky songs, this time recorded following the band's 2012 reunion. The songs included all have a better quality of recording then many of the songs from the original Cheeses... and also includes Kickstarter reward songs to fans who had donated $400 to the campaign.

References

B-side compilation albums
Five Iron Frenzy albums
2003 compilation albums